Richard Nyarko (born 5 September 1984, in Accra) is a Ghanaian footballer who is currently playing for FK Austria ASV Puch.

Career 
Nyarko start his career with Endtime Repentance FC. started his senior career in the reserve of Austrian side SK Sturm Graz, which loaned him second times to SC Fürstenfeld, and one times to SV Oberglan, ESV Knittelfeld and Post SV Graz. After twelve years with SK Sturm left the club and signed in summer 2011 with FK Austria ASV Puch.

Notes

Living people
1984 births
Ghanaian footballers
Association football midfielders